Staurothele areolata is blackish-brown crustose lichen in the family Verrucariaceae. It is found in western North America.

Habitat and range
In Southern California, it is less common, and is found on outcrops of limestone, gneiss, schist, and sandstone. It is found on acid or basic rocks, near water. It is found in the mountains of the United States Sierra Nevada range.

Description
The thallus is crustose with deeply cracked areoles.

References

Verrucariales
Lichen species
Taxa named by Erik Acharius
Lichens of North America
Lichens described in 1814